The Face with Two Left Feet, also known as The Lonely Destiny of John Travolto, is a 1979 Italian comedy film directed by Neri Parenti.

Cast
Giuseppe Spezia as Gianni
Angelo Infanti as Raoul
Gloria Piedimonte as Gloria 
Franco Agostini as Alvin
Claudio Bigagli as Claudio
Massimo Giuliani as Massimo
Adriana Russo as Adriana
Massimo Vanni as Paolo
Sonia Viviani as Deborah
Ilona Staller as Ilona
Enzo Cannavale as Caruso

References

External links

1979 films
Films directed by Neri Parenti
1970s Italian-language films
1979 comedy films
Italian comedy films
1970s Italian films